"If I Could Change Your Mind" is a song by American rock band Haim. It was released on March 21, 2014 as the fifth single from their debut studio album, Days Are Gone (2013). It was the most searched for indie-rock track of 2014 on Shazam.

Description
Hazel Sheffield of NME considered the song to be similar to a Whitney Houston record.

Music video
The video for "If I Could Change Your Mind", directed by Warren Fu, was released on February 25, 2014.

Chart performance
The song peaked at number 27 on the UK Singles Chart.

Weekly charts

Certifications

References

Haim (band) songs
2013 songs
2014 singles
Polydor Records singles
Songs written by James Ford (musician)
Songs written by Danielle Haim
Songs written by Este Haim
Songs written by Alana Haim
Music videos directed by Warren Fu